The 1st/9th (County Antrim) Battalion, Ulster Defence Regiment was formed in 1984 as a result of an amalgamation between the 1st Battalion Ulster Defence Regiment and the 9th Battalion Ulster Defence Regiment.

The amalgamated battalion was the largest in the British Army.

Formation
The formation of the merged battalion was carried out on 20 May 1984, and was done as result of the Royal Ulster Constabulary's territorial reorganisation.  In order to keep their own organisation closely linked to that of the police the UDR carried out its own reorganisation.

History
Battalion HQ in Antrim became the headquarters of the new battalion with companies based at Antrim, Larne, Carrickfergus and Ballymena.

The Coleraine company was transferred to 5UDR and the Lisburn company to 11UDR.

1/9 UDR was responsible for the 700 square mile territory comprising South and mid-Antrim, taking in 153 square miles of Lough Neagh.

1/9 UDR was one of the units merged with the Royal Irish Rangers in 1992 as part of the amalgamation which formed the Royal Irish Regiment.

Uniform, armament & equipment

See: Ulster Defence Regiment Uniform, armament & equipment

Greenfinches

Notable personnel
 :Category:Ulster Defence Regiment soldiers
 :Category:Ulster Defence Regiment officers

See also
The Ulster Defence Regiment
List of battalions and locations of the Ulster Defence Regiment

Bibliography
 A Testimony to Courage – the Regimental History of the Ulster Defence Regiment 1969 – 1992, John Potter, Pen & Sword Books Ltd, 2001, 
 The Ulster Defence Regiment: An Instrument of Peace?, Chris Ryder 1991

References

Battalions of the Ulster Defence Regiment
Military history of County Antrim
1984 establishments in the United Kingdom
1992 disestablishments in the United Kingdom
Military units and formations established in 1984
Military units and formations disestablished in 1992